Marina di Grosseto is a popular tourist destination located twelve kilometers from Grosseto; it is an important seaside resort in Grossetan Maremma.  Once a fishing village, it is known for its hilly hinterland, rich in macchia and wide beaches overlooking the Tyrrhenian Sea, with a vast pine forest that extends from Punta Ala to the Uccellina Mountains.

The comune di Grosseto, encapsulating Marina, is the fourth most visited destination in Tuscany, only preceded by Florence, Pisa and Castiglione della Pescaia for tourist arrivals.

Overview
The town is situated around the center of San Rocco, and the first reports of a residential settlement, dates back to 1793 when Torre del Sale commissioned by Ferdinand III of Tuscany was finished. 

At that time, the village of San Rocco was one of the four guard posts established to protect the coast after the outbreak of fever, which had struck the city of Marseille in France.

Because of its clean water Marina di Grosseto has received the Blue flag of FEEE (Foundation for Environmental Education in Europe) and in 2017 has also received the Green Flag for accessibility. Located on the border with The Natural Park of Maremma, not far from the mouth of the river Ombrone, Marina di Grosseto has grown substantially since the beginning of urbanization in the 20th century, notably after the draining of the marshes of the Maremma district in the 1930s.

Main sights 
Castle of San Rocco
Church of San Rocco
Colonia marina Giuseppina Saragat

See also
Grosseto
Maremma
Alberese
Batignano
Braccagni
Istia d'Ombrone
Montepescali
Principina a Mare
Principina Terra
Rispescia
Roselle, Italy

External links

 Tourism in Southern Maremma

Frazioni of Grosseto
Coastal towns in Tuscany